Vasile Valentin Avădanei (born 30 December 1979) is a Romanian former football player and played as a defender.

External links

1979 births
Living people
Romanian footballers
Association football defenders
Liga I players
Liga II players
CSM Ceahlăul Piatra Neamț players